Bessarion is a station on Line 4 Sheppard of the Toronto subway. Opened in 2002, it was consistently ranked the least-used station on the heavy-rail portion of the subway system (serving an average of 2,500 passengers per weekday between 2008 and 2018), until being displaced by Downsview Park station in 2018. Wi-Fi service is available at this station.

History 
Bessarion opened on November 24, 2002, along with the other stations of the Sheppard line. Due to budget overruns that came up on several occasions during construction, there were suggestions to remove the station from the project for a cost savings of $34 million. In October 1998, it was decided that the station should be built because its surrounding area was a prime target for redevelopment and the station was an important selling feature for proposed housing units pushed by Councillor David Shiner.

When the site was excavated, the soil was found to be contaminated with various levels of hydrocarbons (likely from the former Canadian Tire service station on the site). The soil was removed and decontaminated during the construction of the subway station.

Upon opening, the area surrounding Bessarion station was the low-rise residential neighbourhood of Bayview Village, big box stores and a Canadian Tire distribution centre.

In the mid-2000s, Line 4 was criticised as a "white elephant", with ridership below expected levels. TTC officials privately joked that "keeping ticket sellers awake is the biggest challenge amid the boredom that is Bessarion station".

Since 2007, Concord Park Place, an  condominium and townhouse complex was constructed by developer Concord Adex on a former Canadian Tire distribution centre adjacent to the station. Upon completion, the development was set to consist of 20 residential towers with around 10,000 residents, 2 new schools and a community centre. Early phases of the development (completed in the early 2010s) were criticized for being located far away from the station entrance; however, the developer noted that the development and the community centre would increase ridership at the station. Other residential developments along Sheppard Avenue close to the station have also been proposed.

Between 2008 and 2018, ridership at Bessarion increased by 3%, a small increase compared to a 14% rise in ridership on Line 4 Sheppard overall during the same period. The station maintained roughly half the number of riders of Don Mills, the next busiest station on the line.

Station description 
Like all stations on the Sheppard line, Bessarion is fully accessible and has been since 2002, the year it opened. The main entrance on the south side of Sheppard Avenue is fully accessible, with elevator, escalator, and stair access to the concourse level, where another elevator connects to the subway platform level. The north entrance provides direct access to the concourse level only with stairs.

Architecture and art 
The station was designed by URS Cole Sherman, with the station generally outfitted in tiles of cream and deep red. The public art in the station, titled Passing by Toronto artist Sylvie Belanger, is a frieze of hands, feet, and the backs of heads, which represent the users of the station. The images of feet appear on the concourse level, while the heads appear on the platform level. The images of hands appear along the stairs between the Sheppard Avenue north side entrance and the concourse.

Surface connections 

There are no off-street bus platforms at this station, and connecting service is available at the bus stops on Sheppard Avenue with a valid transfer.

TTC routes serving the station include:

Nearby landmarks 
Nearby landmarks include the Ethennonnhawahstihnen' Park and the future Bessarion Community Centre (part of the Concord Park Place development), Bessarion Parkette, a Canadian Tire, Mark's Work Wearhouse and Mountain Equipment Co-op North York.

References

External links 

Finding Bessarion, a documentary by John Gape featuring Jeremy Woodcock.

Line 4 Sheppard stations
Railway stations in Canada opened in 2002
2002 establishments in Ontario